The William and Jessie M. Adams House is a Prairie school style house located at 9326 South Pleasant Avenue in Chicago, Illinois.

Description and history 
The house was built between 1900 and 1901 by Frank Lloyd Wright. This squarish two-story house with a brick-faced first floor has double-hung windows which Wright usually disdained.

It was designated a Chicago landmark on June 16, 1994.

In March 2014, the house was sold for $980,000 after being owned by the same family since 1952.

References

 Storrer, William Allin. The Frank Lloyd Wright Companion. University Of Chicago Press, 2006,  (S.048)

External links
 The Adams house from the Frank Lloyd Wright Trust website
 Youtube video from an appraiser of the area showing the exterior of the Adams house

Houses completed in 1901
Frank Lloyd Wright buildings
Houses in Chicago
Chicago Landmarks
Prairie School architecture in Illinois